Carl Erik Johannessen (born 16 May 1963) is a Norwegian sailor, born in Bergen. He competed at the 1988 Summer Olympics in Seoul, in the multihull class together with Per Arne Nilsen, and the team finished sixth overall.

References

External links

1963 births
Living people
Sportspeople from Bergen
Norwegian male sailors (sport)
Olympic sailors of Norway
Sailors at the 1988 Summer Olympics – Tornado